Port Republic Historic District may refer to:
Port Republic Historic District (Port Republic, New Jersey)
Port Republic Historic District (Port Republic, Virginia)
Port Republic Road Historic District, Waynesboro, Virginia